Asura latimargo is a moth of the family Erebidae. It is found on Sulawesi.

References

latimargo
Moths described in 1946
Moths of Indonesia